Buli language may refer to:

 Buli language (Ghana), a Gur language
 Buli language (Indonesia), a South Halmahera language
 Biyanda-Buli language, a Gbaya language of the Central African Republic
 a dialect of the Chadic Polci language
 a dialect of the Mongo-Nkundu language